San Uk Ling Holding Centre is a detention centre in Man Kam To, New Territories, Hong Kong. It is located in a remote area, a few hundred metres from the Man Kam To Control Point, a border crossing facility between Hong Kong and China. San Uk Ling Holding Centre opened in July 1979 to house illegal immigrants prior to their repatriation.

San Uk Ling was used to detain protesters during the 2019–2020 Hong Kong protests, and there have been controversial allegations of mistreatment and sexual violence which have been vehemently denied by the police.

History

Establishment and early years
The San Uk Ling holding centre was constructed by the government of the then British Hong Kong in 1979 as an immigration detention facility. The increasing numbers of illegal immigrants attempting to sneak into Hong Kong from China had overburdened an existing detention facility at Ta Kwu Ling, which could only accommodate 60 people. The San Uk Ling facility, with a capacity of around 600, was built to hold illegal immigrants prior to their repatriation across the Chinese border, about a kilometre to the north. 

The holding centre was formally established in July 1979. Due to the huge increase in illegal immigration that year, the Hong Kong Auxiliary Police Force was mobilised, with several platoons posted to the San Uk Ling facility.

It is located immediately south of Man Kam To Control Point, a border crossing which was, until 1985, the only vehicular road link between Hong Kong and China. It was Hong Kong's policy to return illegal immigrants to China within 24 hours of capture. Each day, those held at San Uk Ling were taken to the Man Kam To border crossing and handed over at 12:30 pm. Given the short duration that people were detained there, accommodation at San Uk Ling was rudimentary, with units divided only by steel fencing. By mid-1986, illegal immigration had declined, and the facility only held around 40 people on a daily basis. 

In late 1989 and early 1990, San Uk Ling Holding Centre was converted into a special facility designed to house Vietnamese refugees who were awaiting forced repatriation following their classification as non-refugees. Security was strengthened at this time, and the accommodation was improved. However, it is unclear if the facility was ever used for this purpose.

The holding centre's five residential huts were reportedly fitted with air conditioners in April 1991. In early 1992, the maximum capacity of the facility was said to be 689.

Following the Tiananmen Square massacre of 4 June 1989, San Uk Ling was used as a temporary shelter for movement leaders who were transported to Hong Kong during Operation Yellowbird. During the WTO Ministerial Conference in 2005, arrested militant Korean farmers were sent to San Uk Ling.

2019–2020 Hong Kong protests 
During the 2019–2020 Hong Kong protests, some arrested protestors were sent to San Uk Ling as an overspill detention facility after 5 August 2019. On 11 August 2019 alone, 54 people who were arrested in Causeway Bay and Tsim Sha Tsui were sent there. While Yuen Long, Tuen Mun, Pat Heung, and Sheung Shui police stations being located closer to downtown Hong Kong and having some detainee capacity, San Uk Ling is more remote, making it difficult for arrested persons to contact outsiders. There are no closed-circuit televisions in the entrance and exit passages, meeting rooms and search rooms of San Uk Ling. In response to the reason of using San Uk Ling on 11 August 2019, the Police explained that San Uk Ling was found to be "most suitable" for detaining arresttees with its capacity, high level of security, distance from areas of disturbance and the low risk of attack by protesters since there was a widespread disturbance in various areas in Hong Kong, many police stations that could normally be used as detaining centre were under attack or were too close to the areas of disturbance.

Allegations of tortures to detainees 
In September 2019, 31 people detained in San Uk Ling were sent to North District Hospital, among whom six were seriously injured with bone fractures. One person was reportedly beaten to the point that his arm was connected to his torso only through skin. Others reportedly had their teeth beaten out, and some reportedly suffered intracerebral haemorrhages. There were also allegations of delays in sending the injured to the hospital, and deprivation of necessary medication. Some protesters taken to San Uk Ling also alleged sexual assault by officers there. Six justices of the peace who had wanted to visit San Uk Ling to investigate allegations of mistreatment there saw their request denied. In response to the lawmarker Hon Tanya Chan’s enquires on such allegations, the-then Secretary for Security, Mr John Lee replied in the Legislative Council on 6 November 2019 that among the 30 arrestees who handled in San Uk Ling and required medical treatment, no one reported being injured during the detention.  There were 10 arrestees reporting injuries upon arrival at the centre and the rest only reported ill for treatment.  Regarding the allegation of sexual assault, Lee said that there had been no complaint against police relating to any sexual assault of detainees.

Police’s responses to the allegations 
The Police Public Relations Branch said that all the allegations against the centre were "unnamed", "unverified" and "untrue", that it had been nothing more than a standard detention facility, used in line with police regulations. They said that the centre had since 2 September not been used to hold arrested protesters, who would in future be sent to police stations across the city in case of mass arrests. The spokesman further added that the decision "has nothing to do with the groundless allegations of police of misconduct, and that it was a necessary step "to avoid any further public speculation and unnecessary remarks" as to its continued use.

Official Independent Investigation 
The city’s police watchdog, Independent Police Complaints Council (IPCC), investigated the case in San Uk Ling and subsequently issued its investigation result.   The IPCC confirmed that as at 29 February 2020,  no complaint was made by any arrestee concerning alleged assault in San Uk Ling.  However, the IPCC concluded “with its limitations in set-up and equipment, [the centre] was not suitable for use as a temporary holding area on that occasion.”   The supervisory body also recommended that future detention facilities for mass arrests must be designed to match the standards now available in police arrangements and also review and design a policy of requirements or factors for consideration in identifying a venue to be designated and activated as holding facilities for mass arrests.

Aftermath

The Poon Yung-wai's case on "inciting unlawful assembly" 
A male, Poon Yung-wai, was found that had published four posts in a Facebook group with more than 50,000 members, under the pseudonym “Kim Jong-un” between September 19 and 21, 2019.   In these posts, he claimed to have learned about alleged sexual assaults in San Uk Ling from a police source, saying female protesters detained in San Uk Ling had been molested and raped after they were given sedatives by police officers, with some committing suicide afterwards. “The black cops injected tranquilizer for female protesters and raped them. Many victims killed themselves afterwards, and officers would take their bodies to other places and throw them from above,” as written by Poon. Another post by Poon also said: “It is said that some male protesters were forced to watch female ones being raped, before the men were hit to death.” Police later arrested Poon on October 16 2019 and subsequent searches confirmed that the accused had logged onto Facebook under the pseudonym Kim Jong-un with the devices.   

After a public trial, the court found Poon guilty for inciting unlawful assembly and Poon has been jailed for 13 months.   Mr Justice Jeremy Poon Shiu-chor, Chief judge of the High Court, said the offence warranted a jail sentence even for first-time offenders because it was very serious, considering it involved a targeted attack on law enforcement and a risk of breaching public order.

Cessation of using San Uk Ling to detain arrestees 
On 26 September 2019, the Chief Executive announced that the Police would stop using San Uk Ling detaining facilities to detain the arrestees. This was later confirmed by the Police on 27 September.  The city's police watchdog, IPCC examined the San Uk Ling on 8 October 2019 and discussed with the Hong Kong Police representatives on the procedures for escorting and handling of the arrested persons.  After fully adopting the advice by the IPCC in its report, the Police had installed surveillance cameras at the centre, added a fixed-line telephone and upgraded its broadband service for better security and external communications.   The Police also announced that a task force was formed to review facilities at the San Uk Ling during its open visit by local law-makers and press in May 2020.

Operations and characteristics
Unlike other prisons in Hong Kong, which are run by the Correctional Services Department, San Uk Ling is jointly operated by the Hong Kong Police Force and Immigration Department. As of 2019, the facility continues to be used to hold captured illegal immigrants prior to their repatriation. 

The facility falls under the purview of the Ta Kwu Ling Divisional Police Station. According to a 2019 statement by the Secretary for Security, San Uk Ling contains four cell blocks containing a total of 16 detention cells, which can collectively accommodate around 200 prisoners in total. The cells have stone beds, lighting, air conditioning, and toilets. The complex also has interview rooms.

Contrary to popular belief, the detention centre is no longer located within the Frontier Closed Area, as the size of the closed area was reduced in recent years.

See also
 Allegations of Hong Kong Police Force misconduct surrounding the 2019–2020 Hong Kong protests
 Reputation and controversies of Hong Kong Police
 2019 November Shooting Incident in Sai Wai Ho

References

1979 establishments in Hong Kong
2019–2020 Hong Kong protests
North District, Hong Kong
Police stations in Hong Kong
Prisons in Hong Kong
Police brutality in Hong Kong
Scandals of Hong Kong Police